Jacqueline du Bief (born 4 December 1930) is a French retired figure skater who competed mainly in single skating. She is the 1952 Olympic bronze medalist, the 1952 World champion, a three-time European medalist, and a six-time French national champion (1947–1952).

Bief was born in Paris. As a pair skater, she competed with Tony Font, winning the 1950 & 1951 French national titles. After turning professional, she toured with several shows like Ice Capades, Hollywood Ice Revues, Scala Eisrevue from 1952 to 1964.

Competitive highlights

Ladies' singles

Pairs with Tony Font

References

External links
 Jacqueline du Bief 'Rendez vous avec' - 13/11/1957

1930 births
Living people
French female single skaters
French female pair skaters
Figure skaters at the 1952 Winter Olympics
Figure skaters at the 1948 Winter Olympics
Olympic figure skaters of France
Olympic bronze medalists for France
Figure skaters from Paris
Olympic medalists in figure skating
World Figure Skating Championships medalists
European Figure Skating Championships medalists
Medalists at the 1952 Winter Olympics